Ernest Grady Shore (March 24, 1891 – September 24, 1980) was an American right-handed pitcher in Major League Baseball for the Boston Red Sox during some of their best years in the 1910s.

He was born near East Bend, North Carolina.

Shore graduated from Guilford College in 1914 and continued to return to Guilford during baseball offseasons to serve as a math professor.

Along with Babe Ruth, he was sold by the Baltimore Orioles to the Red Sox.

Shore's best year with the Red Sox was 1915, when he won 18, lost 8 and compiled a 1.64 earned run average. He was 3–1 in World Series action in 1915 and 1916, with a 1.82 earned run average in 34.2 innings pitched.

On June 23, 1917, against the Washington Senators, Ruth started the game, walking the first batter, Ray Morgan. As newspaper accounts of the time relate, the short-fused Ruth then engaged in a heated argument with apparently equally short-fused home plate umpire Brick Owens. Owens tossed Ruth out of the game, and the even more enraged Ruth then slugged the umpire a glancing blow before being escorted off the field by a policeman; the catcher, Pinch Thomas, was also ejected. Shore was brought in to pitch, coming in with very few warmup pitches. With a new pitcher and catcher, runner Morgan tried to steal and was thrown out, after which Shore then proceeded to retire the remaining 26 Senators without allowing a baserunner, earning a 4–0 Red Sox win. For many years the game was listed in record books as a "perfect game", though now, officially, it is scored as a combined no-hitter, the first time this had happened in MLB history. Shore's nine innings of no-hit ball in a combined no-hitter is still an MLB record, with it being matched only by Francisco Cordova (who started his game) on July 12, 1997. Following the game, Ruth paid a $100 fine, was suspended for ten games, and issued a public apology for his behavior.

He missed the  Red Sox World Championship season, having enlisted in the military in that war year. After that season, Shore was sold to the New York Yankees by Red Sox owner Harry Frazee, where he closed out his career in 1920.

Shore was sheriff of Forsyth County, North Carolina for many years, and led the 1950s effort to build a minor league baseball park in Winston-Salem, a park that was ultimately named for him and is the home of the Wake Forest University baseball team.

He died on September 24, 1980, aged 89, the last surviving member of the 1915 and 1916 World Champion Boston Red Sox.

References

External links

Box score of Ernie Shore's combined no-hitter with Babe Ruth
 Interview with Ernie Shore (sound recording) by Dr. Eugene Murdock on Mar. 13, 1978, in Winston-Salem, N.C. (1 hr., 10 min. + additional comments by Dr. Murdock): Part 1 of 2, Park 2 of 2. Available on Cleveland Public Library's Digital Gallery.

1891 births
1980 deaths
People from East Bend, North Carolina
Boston Red Sox players
New York Giants (NL) players
New York Yankees players
Major League Baseball pitchers
Baseball players from Winston-Salem, North Carolina
Guilford Quakers baseball players
Greensboro Patriots players
Baltimore Orioles (IL) players
Vernon Tigers players
San Francisco Seals (baseball) players
Guilford College faculty